is a former Japanese football player and manager. He played for Japan national team. His elder brother Koichi Hashiratani is also a former footballer.

Club career
Hashiratani was educated at and played for Kyoto Commercial High School and Kokushikan University. He played as defender and defensive midfielder. He joined Japan Soccer League side Nissan Motors in 1987. From 1988 to 1990, the club won all three major title in Japan; Japan Soccer League, JSL Cup and Emperor's Cup for 2 years in a row. In 1990s, the club won 1990 JSL Cup, 1991 and 1992 Emperor's Cup. In Asia, the club won 1991–92 Asian Cup Winners' Cup. He moved to Verdy Kawasaki in 1992 when professional league J1 League was founded. The club won the league champions in 1993 and 1994. The club also won 1992, 1993, 1994 J.League Cup and 1996 Emperor's Cup. He was a central player in golden era in both clubs history. He retired in 1998. He was selected Best Eleven for 6 years in a row (1989/90-1995).

He was the first chairman of the J.League Pro-Footballers Association (JPFA).

National team career
Hashiratani was capped 72 times and scored 6 goals for the Japanese national team from 1988 to 1995. He was a member of the Japan team for the 1992 Asian Cup which Japan won. He was the captain when Japan's hope to play in the 1994 World Cup finals was dashed by a late Iraqi equaliser in the final qualifier, the match that the Japanese fans now refer to as the Agony of Doha.

Coaching career
He succeeded Takeshi Okada as the manager of Consadole Sapporo at the beginning of the 2002 season. However, he was sacked after only seven matches. The club was relegated to J2 League that season. Then he coached Kokushikan University and Urawa Reds. He was a coach at Tokyo Verdy from 2006 to 2007. He was promoted to the manager of the club in 2008 but fired by the Verdy after the season. He would later return in 2010 to coach Kokushikan University. He was called back to professional managing once more, as he was announced to lead Mito HollyHock from the 2011 season. After poor results leaving Mito in the relegation zone, he was sacked in the middle of the 2015 season. He was signed to manage J3 League-team Gainare Tottori from the 2016 season, but he lasted only season before signing for JFL's Vanraure Hachinohe. He resigned end of 2017 season. He signed with Giravanz Kitakyushu as Hitoshi Morishita successor in June 2018. The club finished 2018 season at bottom place of 17 club and he resigned end of 2018 season.

Club statistics

National team statistics

Managerial statistics

Honors and awards

Individual Honors
 Japan Soccer League Most Valuable Player: 1988-89
 J1 League Best Eleven: 1993, 1994, 1995

Team Honors
 1992 Asian Cup (Champions)

References

External links
 
 
 Japan National Football Team Database
 
 
 Profile at Vanraure Hachinohe

1964 births
Living people
Kokushikan University alumni
Association football defenders
Association football people from Kyoto Prefecture
Japanese footballers
Japan international footballers
Japan Soccer League players
J1 League players
Yokohama F. Marinos players
Tokyo Verdy players
1992 AFC Asian Cup players
1995 King Fahd Cup players
AFC Asian Cup-winning players
Japanese football managers
J1 League managers
J2 League managers
J3 League managers
Hokkaido Consadole Sapporo managers
Tokyo Verdy managers
Mito HollyHock managers
Gainare Tottori managers
Vanraure Hachinohe managers
Giravanz Kitakyushu managers
Footballers at the 1990 Asian Games
Asian Games competitors for Japan
Footballers at the 1994 Asian Games
Presidents of the Japan Pro-Footballers Association